Camilo Ernesto Romero Galeano (born July 17, 1976) is a Colombian journalist and politician who served as Governor of Nariño from 2016 to 2019. A member of the Green Alliance, Romero was an unsuccessful candidate in the 2022 Colombian presidential election, losing the Historic Pact for Colombia primary to Gustavo Petro.

Early life and education 
Romero was born in Ipiales, Nariño on July 17, 1976. He is the son of politician Ricardo Romero Sánchez and the nephew of political leader Heraldo Romero Sánchez. Romero studied journalism at the Universidad Autónoma de Occidente.

Career 
Romero participated in the creation of Telesur in 2005, later become the station's lead correspondent in Colombia. In 2008, Romero helped form the Vamos Independientes political collective associated with the Alternative Democratic Pole.

In the 2010 parliamentary elections, Romero was elected to the Senate of Colombia. In the 2014 presidential election, Romero ran in the Green Alliance presidential primary, but lost the nomination to former Mayor of Bogota Enrique Peñalosa.

In the 2015 regional election, Romero was elected Governor of Nariño with the support of the Somos Nariño coalition. His candidacy was supported by the Green Alliance and the Indigenous Authorities of Colombia (AICO) party. Romero mounted another presidential run in 2022, but lost the Historic Pact for Colombia primary to Gustavo Petro.

|-

|-

References 

21st-century Colombian politicians
Living people
1976 births
Members of the Senate of Colombia